Enteromius deserti is a species of ray-finned fish in the genus Enteromius. It is found in permanent, spring fed oases and their associated temporary flows in wadis in the Tassili and Ahaggar mountains in southern Algeria. It formerly occurred in the Tibesti Mountains in southern Libya but are believed to have been extirpated from there.

Footnotes 

 

Enteromius
Taxa named by Jacques Pellegrin
Fish described in 1909